WKTZ (1220 AM) is an American radio station licensed to serve Jacksonville, Florida, United States. Established in 1958, the station is currently owned and operated by the American Family Association, and is that organization's only station on the AM band.

The station was assigned the call sign "WJAX" by the Federal Communications Commission (FCC) on May 26, 1987 and then assigned the callsign WKTZ on November 5, 2014.

Programming
Until November 2014, WJAX featured the syndicated America's Best Music format of adult standards and adult contemporary oldies music distributed by Westwood One, and streams online. Previously, the station aired Music of Your Life, which Jones Radio Networks distributed until January 19, 2008, and then aired Jones' Jones Standards format until it was discontinued in September 2008 and absorbed into America's Best Music following Triton Media Group's (owners of Westwood One's predecessor Dial Global) purchase of Jones.

History
The station began broadcasting from a transmitter located at the water plant across from Confederate Park near First and Main streets. The station was owned by the city government. WJAX was also an FM station on 95.1 and played album rock throughout the 1970s. The company that purchased WJAX-FM from the city in the early 1980s also owned WAPE at 690 AM, which is now WOKV. When the deal was done, the WAPE call sign took over the spot at 95.1 and for a short while simulcast their top 40 format on both AM and FM frequencies. The call sign languished unused for years, but made a comeback on the AM dial as a station owned and operated by Jones College. The original WJAX at 930 AM is now WFXJ. The WJAX call sign has been used by Jacksonville's CBS station WJAX-TV since 2014.

Translators

References

External links

KTZ
Radio stations established in 1958
Duval County, Florida
KTZ
American Family Radio stations
1958 establishments in Florida